Kasa-Vubu is a Congolese name which may refer to:

Joseph Kasa-Vubu, the first President of the Democratic Republic of the Congo
Justine Kasa-Vubu, a Congolese politician
Kasa-Vubu, Kinshasa, a district of Kinshasa named in honour of Joseph Kasa-Vubu
Kasavubu (wrestler), American professional wrestler